The World Deaf Championships records in swimming are the fastest ever performances of deaf athletes swum at any edition of the meet, which are recognised and ratified by the Comité International des Sports des Sourds and FINA.

All times are swum in a long-course (50m) pool. All records were set in finals unless noted otherwise.

Men

Women

Mixed Relay

References

World Deaf Championships
Deaf culture
Deaf sports